Dean Jackson was the interim Head Coach as of January, 2017, following Josh Brandwene's leave of absence. 

The Penn State Nittany Lions women represent Penn State University in CHA women's ice hockey during the 2016-17 NCAA Division I women's ice hockey season.

Standings

Offseason
April 22:  2016 Graduate Celine Whitlinger was tabbed for the 2015 USA Hockey Women’s Goaltender Development program.

Roster

2016–17 Nittany Lions

Schedule

|-
!colspan=12 style=""| Regular Season

|-
!colspan=12 style=""| CHA Tournament

Awards and honors

References

Penn State
Penn State women's ice hockey seasons